The Krasnogorsk-2 (ru. Красногорск-2) is 16mm spring-wound film camera with a mirror shutter, produced by Krasnogorsky Zavod from 1966 to 1977. It was released in the same year as the Krasnogorsk-1.

Function
The film is moved by a spring drive using a single registration pin, which allows both double and single-perforated film. The camera can record up to 30 seconds of film per wind-up. The framerate can be adjusted on the AC side, and the K-2 can record between 8 and 48 fps. The camera also has a single frame mode, using a flexible trigger cable at the rear side of the camera.

This camera had an internal cassette in the magazine, which could fit 100 ft (30 meters) of a 16 mm film spools. This way the film could be replaced without risking light leaks.

A butterfly two-blade shutter opens at 150° (2 × 75°) and provides over a mirror system an exact replica of the recorded frame to the eyepiece. The viewfinder also has a built-in lightmeter, which gives an approximate light measuring of the whole frame.

The camera could be attached to a tripod using a standard 3/8 "screw or to a pistol grip with a shoulder rest for handheld shooting.

The Krasnogorsk-2 has a Krasnogorsk Bayonette mount, which adapted to the following lenses:
 Meteor 5-1 17-69mm, f1.9
 Vega-7 20mm f2
 Vega-9 50mm f2
 Mir-11, 12, 5mm f2

The camera weighs 6.7 lbs (3 kg) without accessories.

History
The camera was introduced in 1966 by Krasnogorsky Zavod as a result of Nikita Khrushchev's reforms to produce more consumer devices in the USSR. It was very popular among amateur filmmakers in Eastern Europe. The production was discontinued in 1977 when the Krasnogorsk-3 took over completely. The K-2 still remains popular among amateur filmmakers due to its low price (around $200 for a complete set) and small build. Between 1966 and 1977 over 15,000 Krasnogorsk-2 cameras were sold.

See also 

 Krasnogorsk-3
 Bolex
 Filmo

References

External links

Movie cameras
Soviet cameras